Atarfe Industrial Club de Fútbol is a Spanish football team based in Atarfe, in the autonomous community of Andalusia. Founded in 1970, it plays in División de Honor – Group 2, holding home matches at Estadio Municipal de Atarfe.

History 
The first glimpses of Atarfe playing in non-federated championships date back to 1931, according to Antonio Lasso in his book "75 years of Granada football".

Season to season

14 seasons in Tercera División

References

External links
Fútbol Regional team profile 
ArefePedia team profile 

Football clubs in Andalusia
Association football clubs established in 1970
1970 establishments in Spain
Province of Granada